Travis Simpson is a former center in the National Football League.

Biography
Simpson was born Travis Theron Simpson on November 19, 1963, in Norman, Oklahoma.

Career
Simpson played with the Green Bay Packers during the 1987 NFL season. He played at the collegiate level at the University of Oklahoma.

See also
List of Green Bay Packers players

References

Sportspeople from Norman, Oklahoma
Green Bay Packers players
American football centers
University of Oklahoma alumni
Oklahoma Sooners football players
1963 births
Living people